The Treasure of San Teresa (German: Rhapsodie in Blei) is a 1959 British-West German thriller film directed by Alvin Rakoff and starring Eddie Constantine, Dawn Addams and Marius Goring. It was based on a play by Jeffrey Dell. The film is also known by the alternative titles Hot Money Girl, Long Distance, and Rhapsody in Blei.

Plot
Ex-OSS operative Larry Brennan (Eddie Constantine) returns to Czechoslovakia after retiring from his military service during World War II. He is intent on seeking out a hidden cache of Nazi jewels stashed in this country during the war. There he has to join with Hedi von Hartmann (Dawn Addams), his former lover and a daughter of the German general who previously owned the gems, but Larry is not sure whether he can trust her. Soon Larry begins to realise that he is being double-crossed and triple-crossed.

Cast
 Eddie Constantine as Larry Brennan 
 Dawn Addams as Hedi von Hartmann 
 Marius Goring as Rudi Siebert 
 Christopher Lee as Jaeger 
 Nadine Tallier as Zizi 
 Walter Gotell as Hamburg inspector 
 Willi Witte as von Hartmann 
 Leslie "Hutch" Hutchinson as Piano player at Billie's
 Gaylord Cavallaro as Mike Jones 
 Hubert Mittendorf as Schneider 
 Derek Sydney as Barman 
 Penelope Horner as Bar girl 
 Georgina Cookson as Billie 
 Clive Dunn as Cemetery keeper 
 Sheldon Lawrence as Patrolling policeman 
 Steve Plytas as Station sergeant 
 Thomas Gallagher as Truck driver 
 Stella Bonheur as Sister Angelica 
 Tom Bowman as Tough 
 Margaret Boyd as Sister Catherine 
 Walter Buhler as Uniformed Policeman 
 Tsai Chin as 1st girl in fight 
 Marie Devereux as Girl with the Mink 
 Diane Potter as 2nd girl in fight 
 Susan Travers as Girl at Billie's 
 Anna Turner as Billie's maid

References

External links

1959 films
West German films
British thriller films
German thriller films
1950s thriller films
English-language German films
Films directed by Alvin Rakoff
Constantin Film films
British Lion Films films
Films shot at Beaconsfield Studios
Films set in Czechoslovakia
Films shot at British National Studios
1950s English-language films
1950s British films
1950s German films